Lamellitrochus suavis is a species of sea snail, a marine gastropod mollusk in the family Solariellidae.

Description
The shell grows to a length of 3.4 mm.

Distribution
This marine species was found off Barbados.

References

 Quinn, J. F., Jr. 1991. Lamellitrochus, a new genus of Solariellinae (Gastropoda: Trochidae), with descriptions of six new species from the Western Atlantic Ocean. Nautilus 105: 81-91

External links
 To Biodiversity Heritage Library (1 publication)
 To Encyclopedia of Life
 To USNM Invertebrate Zoology Mollusca Collection
 To World Register of Marine Species

suavis
Gastropods described in 1991